Wilhelm List (14 May 1880 – 17 August 1971) was a German field marshal during World War II who was convicted of war crimes by a US Army tribunal after the war. List commanded the 14th Army in the invasion of Poland and the 12th Army in the invasions of France, Yugoslavia and Greece. In 1941 he commanded the German forces in Southeast Europe responsible for the occupation of Greece and Yugoslavia. In July 1942 during Case Blue, the German summer offensive in Southern Russia, he was appointed commander of Army Group A, responsible for the main thrust towards the Caucasus and Baku.

Following the war, List was charged with war crimes and crimes against humanity and stood trial in the Hostages Trial of 1947. He was convicted and sentenced to life imprisonment. List was released early for poor health and died in 1971.

Early years 
List, born in Oberkirchberg in Württemberg in 1880, entered the Bavarian Army in 1898; in 1913 he joined the  Bavarian General Staff.
He served as a staff officer in World War I (1914-1918). After the war, List stayed in the Reichswehr. By 1932, he was promoted to Generalleutnant. In 1938, after the Anschluss of Austria with Germany, List had the task of integrating the Austrian Armed Forces into the Wehrmacht.

World War II
In 1939, List commanded the German 14th Army in the invasion of Poland. It was List's task to advance his army into southern Poland immediately at the start of the invasion, to form the extreme southern wing of an encircling manoeuver carried out by the German forces aimed at trapping the Polish field army in the general region of Warsaw. He didn't fulfill this mission, although he met advance elements of the German XIX Panzer Corps under General Heinz Guderian a short distance south of Brest-Litovsk, on 17 September 1939. Following the conclusion of the fighting in Poland, which was accelerated by the occupation of the eastern part of the country by Soviet forces (as agreed to in the Molotov–Ribbentrop Pact), List and his army remained posted in Poland as occupying forces.

Invasion of France
During the huge German offensive against France and the Low Countries May to June 1940, the 14th army remained in Poland, but this was not the case with its commander. In May 1940 List commanded the 12th German army during the fall of France. The 12th army was a unit of the German Army Group A, under command of Gerd von Rundstedt. It was this Army Group that successfully forced the Ardennes and then made the imperative break-through on 15 May 1940, which spread panic in the French forces and cut the British expeditionary forces off from their supply lines.

After this successful campaign List was among the twelve generals that Hitler promoted to Field Marshal during the 1940 Field Marshal Ceremony. In early 1941, German troops were being steadily massed on the Eastern Front of the Third Reich, in preparation for Operation Barbarossa, the German invasion of the Soviet Union. OKW believed that before Barbarossa could be launched it would be necessary to eliminate the possibility of interference from Greece by militarily subduing this country, in an operation codenamed Operation Marita. List was delegated to negotiate with the Bulgarian General Staff, and a secret agreement was signed allowing the free passage of German troops through Bulgarian territory. On the night of 28/29 February 1941, German troops—including List, who now commanded the 12th Army—took up positions in Bulgaria, which the next day joined the Tripartite Pact.

Invasion of Greece and Yugoslavia

On 6 April 1941 the Wehrmacht launched invasions both of Greece and of Yugoslavia. List's 12th Army, consisting of four armored divisions and 11 motorized infantry divisions, totally outmatched the defending forces. German forces occupied Belgrade on 13 April and Athens on 27 April. The mainland Balkans campaign ended with the evacuation of British forces on 28 April. In the Balkans List became implicated in the mass murder of hundreds of thousands of civilians by having ordered hostage-taking and reprisal killings.

Summer campaign of 1942 and dismissal
In early July 1942, List took command of Army Group A, newly formed from the split of Army Group South during the Germans’ summer offensive named Case Blue. His orders were to take Rostov and then advance into the Caucasus to take oil rich areas of Maikop and Grozny.

However, by the end of August their advance had ground to a halt, chiefly due to considerably stiffened Soviet resistance, and also due to critical shortages of fuel and ammunition as the army group outran its supply lines. Matters were made worse for the Germans by the removal in mid-August of most Luftwaffe combat units to the north to support the 6th Army’s drive on Stalingrad.

Hitler was angered by the loss of momentum. He sent Alfred Jodl on 7 September to visit List and tell him to make faster progress. List explained to Jodl that he didn't have enough forces to break through the Soviet lines to capture Grozny. List also believed that it was still possible to capture Grozny if all the other attacks were suspended and his army group was given priority in supplies and reinforcements. Jodl subsequently agreed with List and he relayed this information to Hitler, who became furious. When List proposed moving some stalled spearhead units to another, less advanced portion of the front to assist in destroying stubborn Soviet forces, Hitler relieved him of command on 9 September and tried to command the Army Group himself from OKH. On 22 November 1942, he placed Paul Ludwig Ewald von Kleist in charge. List spent the rest of the war at his home and never returned to active duty.

Hostages trial

List was arrested by the Allies after the war. In 1947, List and 11 former subordinates were charged with war crimes and crimes against humanity—primarily the reprisal killing of Serbian hostages in Yugoslavia. List was tried in front of a U.S. military court in the Hostages Trial, convicted and sentenced to life imprisonment in February 1948. List was released from prison in December 1952, officially because of ill health. However, he lived for another 19 years, dying on 17 August 1971 at the age of 91.

Awards
 Wound Badge (1918) in black
 Iron Cross (1914), 1st and 2nd class
 Clasp to the Iron Cross (1939), 1st and 2nd class
 Knights Cross of the House Order of Hohenzollern with Swords
 Knight's Cross of the Iron Cross on 30 September 1939 as Generaloberst and commander-in-chief of the 14. Armee
 Military Merit Order, 4th class with Swords and Crown (Bavaria)
 Knight's Cross of the Friedrich Order (Württemberg)
 Military Merit Cross, 3rd class with war decoration (Austria-Hungary)
 Knight's Cross of the Order of Military Merit (Bulgaria) (Bulgaria)

References

Citations

Bibliography

 
Hayward, Joel S. A. Stopped At Stalingrad. University Press of Kansas; Lawrence: 1998. .

External links 
  
(In German)  
 Wilhelm List biography on deutsche-biographie.de  
 

1880 births
1971 deaths
People from Alb-Donau-Kreis
People from the Kingdom of Württemberg
German Army World War II field marshals
Military personnel of Bavaria
German Army personnel of World War I
Recipients of the Knight's Cross of the Iron Cross
Knights of the Order of Military Merit (Bulgaria)
German people convicted of crimes against humanity
People convicted by the United States Nuremberg Military Tribunals
German prisoners sentenced to life imprisonment
Prisoners sentenced to life imprisonment by the United States military
Burials at Munich Waldfriedhof
Recipients of the clasp to the Iron Cross, 1st class
Lieutenant generals of the Reichswehr
20th-century Freikorps personnel
Military personnel from Baden-Württemberg
German people convicted of war crimes